Henry White (5 August 1890 – 4 February 1964) was a British Labour politician who served as Member of Parliament (MP) for the constituency of North East Derbyshire from 1942 to 1959.

White was a miner and served as vice-president of the Derbyshire Mineworkers' Association for four years and as a branch secretary for 18 years. He was a councillor and alderman on Derbyshire County Council for many years and divisional party organiser.
He was first elected to Parliament unopposed in a by-election in 1942, following the death of the sitting MP Frank Lee. He died in Chesterfield aged 73.

References

External links 
 

1890 births
1964 deaths
People from North East Derbyshire District
Labour Party (UK) MPs for English constituencies
Members of the Parliament of the United Kingdom for constituencies in Derbyshire
Miners' Federation of Great Britain-sponsored MPs
National Union of Mineworkers-sponsored MPs
UK MPs 1935–1945
UK MPs 1945–1950
UK MPs 1950–1951
UK MPs 1951–1955
UK MPs 1955–1959
Councillors in Derbyshire